Lord Francis William Bouverie Douglas (8 February 1847 – 14 July 1865) was a novice British mountaineer. After sharing in the first ascent of the Matterhorn, he died in a fall on the way down from the summit.

Early life

Born in Scotland at Cummertrees, Dumfries, Douglas was the son of Archibald William Douglas, 8th Marquess of Queensberry and his wife Caroline, daughter of General Sir William Robert Clayton, Bt. (1786–1866), member of parliament for Great Marlow. He had an older sister, Lady Gertrude Georgiana Douglas (1842–1893); an older brother, John Sholto Douglas, Viscount Drumlanrig (1844–1900), later the ninth Marquess of Queensberry; a younger brother, Lord Archibald Edward Douglas (1850–1938), who became a clergyman; and a younger brother and sister, the twins Lord James Douglas (d. 1891) and Lady Florence Douglas (1855–1905), who married Sir Alexander Beaumont Churchill Dixie, 11th Baronet. He was an uncle of Oscar Wilde's lover Lord Alfred Douglas, and a younger brother of John Douglas, 9th Marquess of Queensberry.

In 1858, Douglas's father, Lord Queensberry, died in what was reported as a shooting accident, but his death was widely believed to have been suicide. In 1862, his mother, Lady Queensberry, converted to Roman Catholicism and took her children to live in Paris.

Douglas was educated at the Edinburgh Academy.

Triumph and death on the Matterhorn

At the beginning of 1865, the Matterhorn was still unconquered, and more than one assault on it was planned. One such group consisted of Douglas, Edward Whymper, and their guide Peter Taugwalder. Whymper had already made several unsuccessful attempts on the mountain. On 5 July, this group made the second ascent (and the first by the north-north-west ridge) of the Ober Gabelhorn, a peak of 4,053 metres on the north-west side of the Matterhorn; also in July, Douglas made the first ascent of the nearby Unter Gabelhorn (3,391 m) with guides Peter Taugwalder and P. Inäbnit.

Hearing of a planned assault on the main peak by an Italian party, Douglas and Whymper joined forces with two other British climbers, Charles Hudson and Douglas Robert Hadow, and their guide Michel Croz.

At 4:30 a.m. on 13 July, a combined party of seven men, led by Whymper, set off for the Matterhorn under a clear sky: Whymper, Douglas, Hudson and Hadow, plus Taugwalder and son, and Croz. They climbed past the Schwarzsee to a plateau where they camped. Meanwhile, the Italians, led by Carrel, had camped at a height of about 4000 meters on the Lion Ridge.

On 14 July, Whymper's party proceeded to a successful first ascent by the Hörnli route. However, on the way down, Hadow fell, knocking down Croz, and also dragging Hudson and Douglas, connected by a rope. The four fell to their deaths on the Matterhorn Glacier 1,400 metres below. Three of the bodies lost were later found, but not Douglas's.

Whymper later described the deaths as follows: 

The rival party of Italian alpinists reached the Matterhorn's summit three days later.

Aftermath
The deaths of Douglas, Croz, Hadow and Hudson led to years of recriminations and debate, many blaming Whymper, others suggesting sabotage and even murder. The coroner in Zermatt (a hotelier) asked few searching questions, and the climbing fraternity was deeply divided over the matter until long after the deaths of all concerned. The incident is seen as marking the end of the Golden age of alpinism.

The Rev. Arthur G. Butler was inspired to defend the climbing of the Matterhorn in verse: 

40 years after the accident, Lord Francis Douglas's sister still hoped that the remains of her brother could be found. Exactly 150 years after the accident an attempt was made to find Douglas's remains.

Ancestry

Related images

Notes

Bibliography
 
 
  Condensed as Ascent of the Matterhorn (1879).

1847 births
1865 deaths
Mountaineering deaths
People educated at Edinburgh Academy
People from Dumfries and Galloway
Scottish mountain climbers
Sport deaths in Switzerland
Younger sons of marquesses